The Devil Is a Woman (UK title: The Tempter) is a 1974 drama film directed by Damiano Damiani and starring Glenda Jackson.

Plot
Sister Geraldine is the head of a convent that has a hospital wing for troubled patients. She resorts to bullying and tormenting those who come to this place, but things change when Rodolfo, a writer editing the life story of a priest who collaborated with the Nazis, comes to stay.

Cast
 Glenda Jackson as Sister Geraldine
 Claudio Cassinelli as Rodolfo Solina
 Lisa Harrow as Emilia Contreras
 Adolfo Celi as Father Borelli
 Duilio Del Prete as Monsignor Salvi
 Arnoldo Foà as Monsignor Badensky
 Gabriele Lavia as Prince Ottavio Ranieri d'Aragona
 Francisco Rabal as Bishop Marquez
 André Trottier as Bishop's Assistant
 Rolf Tasna as Monsignor Meitner
 Sara Sperati (as Adele Sperati) as Princess Alessandra Ranieri d'Aragona
 Edoardo Canali
 Edda Ferronao as Kitchen maid
 Ely Galleani as Rodolfo's girlfriend
 Margherita Horowitz as Prince Ottavio's mother
 Fabrizio Jovine as The Doctor

External links

1974 films
1974 drama films
British drama films
Italian drama films
English-language Italian films
Films directed by Damiano Damiani
Films scored by Ennio Morricone
1970s English-language films
1970s British films
1970s Italian films